Prince Nicholas Bagration of Mukhrani (1807–1864) was a Georgian nobleman of the House of Mukhrani.

Prince Nicholas was son of Prince Edisher Bagration of Mukhrani (born 1787) descended from Prince Constantine I of Mukhrani.

On 11 November 1823 Prince Nicholas married Princess Tamar Jorjadze (1813–1878) and had 12 children:
Salome Bagration of Mukhrani (1825–1869)
Nina Bagration of Mukhrani (1830–1843)
Mariam Bagration of Mukhrani (born 1832)
Irakli Bagration of Mukhrani (1833–1857)
George Nikolaevich Bagration (1834–1882)
 Niko Bagrationi "the Boer"
Martha Bagration of Mukhrani (1836–1892)
Alexander Bagration of Mukhrani (1838–1841)
Ana Bagration of Mukhrani (1839–1913)
Makrina Bagration of Mukhrani (1842–1919)
Elene Bagration of Mukhrani (born 1844)
Elisabed Bagration of Mukhrani (born 1844)
Elizbar Bagration of Mukhrani (1861–1888)

Prince Nicholas died on 10 May 1864.

References

 ბაგრატიონები: სამეცნიერო და კულტურული მემკვიდრეობა, თბილისი, 2003 The Bagrations: Scientific and Cultural heritage, Tbilisi, 2003
 მუხრანბატონები: ნიკოლოზ ედიშერის ძე მუხრანბატონი Lords of Mukhrani: Nikoloz Edisheris dze Mukhranbatoni

1807 births
1864 deaths
House of Mukhrani